Aturidae is a family of mites belonging to the order Trombidiformes.

Genera

Genera:
 Abelaturus Cook, 1985
 Adelaxonopsella Cook, 1974
 Albaxona Szalay, 1944
 Kuschelacarus  Cook, 1992

References

Trombidiformes